Gustave Langenus (1883–1957) was a Belgian clarinetist. He is known for his mouthpiece design and 1913 method book, an important early pedagogical device for the Boehm system clarinet. He was principal clarinetist with the New York Symphony.

References

Belgian clarinetists
1883 births
1957 deaths